Emmanuel "Manno" Sanon (25 June 1951 – 21 February 2008) was a Haitian professional footballer who played as a striker. He starred in the Haiti national team winning the 1973 CONCACAF Championship. Haiti qualified for the finals of the 1974 FIFA World Cup. Though they lost all three matches Sanon scored twice in the tournament.
His goal against Italy when he ran onto a pass from  Philippe Vorbe was the first conceded by Italian keeper Dino Zoff in 1,142 minutes of football.

Sanon won his home national championship in 1971 with top-level Don Bosco. He then won the Belgian Cup in the Belgian Pro League in 1979 with the K. Beerschot V.A.C.

Sanon is among the "Les 100 Héros de la Coupe du Monde" (100 Heroes of the World Cup), which included the top 100 World Cup Players from 1930 to 1990, a list drawn up in 1994 by the France Football magazine based exclusively on their performances at World Cup level.

Early life
Sanon attended the Lycée de Pétion-Ville Secondary School.

Club career
Sanon spent four season with his home club Don Bosco, where he won the national championship in 1971. He then spent six seasons for the K. Beerschot V.A.C., where he won the Belgian Cup in 1979 with a decisive assist to Johan Coninx for the only goal scored. He would finish his tenure in the Belgian Pro League, with 142 matches and 43 goals.

In 1980, Sanon signed with the Miami Americans of the second division American Soccer League. When head coach Ron Newman left the team on 20 June 1980 to become the head coach of the San Diego Sockers of the first division North American Soccer League, he induced Sanon to also move to the Sockers. Sanon spent three seasons with the Sockers until he suffered a career ending knee injury.

International career
Sanon earned 65 caps and 37 goals for the Haiti national football team.

1974 FIFA World Cup
Having qualified by first knocking out Puerto Rico in a play-off, then topping the final group in the capital Port-au-Prince, Haiti was drawn into a very difficult group featuring two-time champions Italy, future champions Argentina, and Poland, who managed third place in the tournament. While they predictably finished last in the group with three losses and a -12 goal difference, Emmanuel Sanon scored both goals for the country in the tournament. He scored against Argentina in the last game of the group, but by far the most famous goal occurred against Italy. The Azzurri had not let in a goal in 19 games prior to the World Cup, thanks to goalkeeper Dino Zoff. In the opening of the second half, Sanon shocked the Italians with the opening goal. However this lead did not hold and Italy went on to win 3–1. By the time Haiti was tossed from the tournament after losing 7–0 to Poland and 4–1 to Argentina, Sanon had nonetheless cemented his place in footballing history.

Coaching career
Sanon coached the Haiti national team for a year from 1999 to 2000, during which he led his team to the 2000 CONCACAF Gold Cup.

Death
On 21 February 2008, Emmanuel Sanon died in Orlando, Florida, of pancreatic cancer, aged 56. The Haitian Legislature voted to award a perpetual exempted pension to his family posthumously as an honorific gesture for scoring the goals in Haiti's 1974 FIFA World Cup participation.

Career statistics
This list is not completed yet
Scores and results list Haiti's goal tally first, score column indicates score after each Sanon goal.

Honours
Don Bosco
 Ligue Haïtienne: 1971

Beerschot
 Belgian Cup: 1978–79
 Belgian Super Cup runner-up: 1979

San Diego Sockers
 NASL Indoor season: 1981–82

Haiti
 CONCACAF Championship: 1973; runner-up 1971, 1977

Individual
 France Football: FIFA World Cup Top-100 1930–1990
 Haitian Athlete of the Century (1999)

Orders
 National Order of Honour and Merit: Commander (2007)

References

External links
 
 
 FIFA: Remembering Manno

1951 births
2008 deaths
Sportspeople from Port-au-Prince
Haitian footballers
Association football forwards
Haiti international footballers
CONCACAF Championship-winning players
1974 FIFA World Cup players
Belgian Pro League players
Ligue Haïtienne players
American Soccer League (1933–1983) players
North American Soccer League (1968–1984) players
North American Soccer League (1968–1984) indoor players
Don Bosco FC players
K. Beerschot V.A.C. players
Miami Americans players
San Diego Sockers (NASL) players
Haitian football managers
Deaths from pancreatic cancer
Haitian expatriate footballers
Haitian expatriate sportspeople in Belgium
Expatriate footballers in Belgium
Haitian expatriate sportspeople in the United States
Expatriate soccer players in the United States